Denis E. Guyer (born July 11, 1966 in Pittsfield, Massachusetts) is an American politician who represented the 2nd Berkshire District in the Massachusetts House of Representatives from 2005–2011. He had previously served as a member of the Board of Selectmen in Dalton, Massachusetts from 2001–2004. He served as Vice Chairman of the Joint Committee on the Environment, Natural Resources and Agriculture from 2009-2011, At the time he served, the Second Berkshire District was geographically the largest House District in the Massachusetts Legislature, consisting of twenty towns and precinct B in Ward One of the City of Pittsfield

References

1966 births
Democratic Party members of the Massachusetts House of Representatives
People from Pittsfield, Massachusetts
Massachusetts College of Liberal Arts alumni
Living people
People from Dalton, Massachusetts